The Great Northern Railway (Ireland) JT class comprised six  locomotives, all built between 1895 and 1902 at their Dundalk Works.  These were of a J. C. Park design, but introduced following his death. They were used on Dublin suburban services; then on branch lines, including operation of the Dundalk, Newry and Greenore Railway when taken over in 1933.  Most were withdrawn shortly after 1955 between 1955 and 1957 but one remained passed to Córas Iompair Éireann (CIÉ) and remained in service until 1963.

History
The JT class comprised six  locomotives, all built between 1895 and 1902 at their Dundalk Works.  These were of a J. C. Park design, but introduced following his death. They were used on Dublin suburban services; then on branch lines, including operation of the Dundalk, Newry and Greenore Railway when taken over in 1933. Most were withdrawn between 1955 and 1957, but No. 91 (ex No. 13 Tulip) passed to Córas Iompair Éireann (CIÉ), and lasted until 1963.

Fleet details
They were subject to enlargement as batches were introduced, and rebuilt between 1917 and 1925 with improved  boilers and standard  cylinders.

Preservation
One member of the class, No. 93 is preserved at the Ulster Folk and Transport Museum at Cultra, Co. Down.

References

 
 
 

JT
2-4-2T locomotives
5 ft 3 in gauge locomotives
Railway locomotives introduced in 1895
1′B1′ n2t locomotives
Steam locomotives of Ireland
Steam locomotives of Northern Ireland